Kang Ji-min (born 28 January 1980) is a South Korean professional golfer who plays primarily on the LPGA Tour.

Kang had a distinguished amateur career including finishing runner-up in 1999 U.S. Women's Amateur. She attended Arizona State University. She turned professional in 2002.

Kang played on the Futures Tour from 2002 to 2004, winning three times. In 2004, she won the Player of the Year honors and the money list title to earn her LPGA Tour card for 2005.

Kang won the 2005 LPGA Corning Classic, which included a hole-in-one at the short 15th hole in the final round.

In 2013, Kang was forced to take time off from golf after her immune system shut down and played the 2014 on the LPGA Tour and 2015 seasons on the Symetra Tour. She returned to Arizona State for her degree and earned her LPGA teaching certification in 2018. Kang qualified for the 2019 Women's PGA Championship via a qualifying tournament reserved for LPGA teaching and club professionals and finished T78, the only one to make the cut.

Professional wins (7)

LPGA Tour wins (2)

Symetra Tour wins (4)
2002 M&T Bank Loretto Futures Golf Classic
2004 Greater Tampa Duramed Futures Classic, Betty Puskar Golf Classic
2015 Mission Health Wellness Classic, Decatur-Forsyth Classic (unofficial, shortened to 18 holes)

Results in LPGA majors
Results not in chronological order before 2019.

^ The Women's British Open replaced the du Maurier Classic as an LPGA major in 2001.
* The Evian Championship became an LPGA major in 2013.

CUT = missed the half-way cut.
WD = withdrew
"T" = tied

Summary

Most consecutive cuts made – 4 (2007 ANA - 2007 British)
Longest streak of top-10s – 1 (twice)

References

External links

Jimin Kang at 2009 U.S. Women's Open (archived)

South Korean female golfers
LPGA Tour golfers
Golfers from Scottsdale, Arizona
1980 births
Living people